Piauhytherium is an extinct genus of herbivorous notoungulate mammal of the family Toxodontidae. It lived during the Late Pleistocene; fossils have been found in Brazil. The only known species is Piauhytherium capivarae.

Description 
This animal in general terms resembles a hippopotamus, with a big short snout, a massive body and a large head. The skull measured almost  in length, which indicates that Piauhytherium could be as big as a modern black rhinoceros. With regard to its nearest relatives, such as Toxodon, this animal's legs were shorter and thicker, in addition, certain differences in the denture distinguish it from other notoungulates of this period.

Classification 
Piauhytherium capivarae was described for the first time in 2013, based on a complete skull including a jaw and some postcranial bones found in Serra da Capivara in Piauí, in northeastern Brazil. This animal belonged to a group of notoungulates known as Toxodonta, which comprises numerous herbivores from the Cenozoic of South America, whose better-known representative is Toxodon. (Some remains found in Brazil have been reassigned to Piauhytherium.) Piauhytherium was very similar to Toxodon, but is differentiated in some features of is leg bones and characteristics of the teeth.

The 2018 study that described Falcontoxodon found Piauhytherium, along with Mixotoxodon, Gyrinodon and Falcontoxodon, to be in the same monophyletic clade within Toxodontinae. Below is a parsimony tree establishing the relationships between the genera of Toxodontidae, as proposed by Carrillo et al, 2018.

Paleobiology 
The limb bones, which are particularly short and massive, led the authors of the original scientific description to hypothesise that P. capivarae led a semiaquatic lifestyle, similar to that of modern  hippopotamus. This hypothesis had already been previously proposed for other toxodontids (including Toxodon), but equally has been refuted by other studies. The discovery of Piauhytherium is remarkable since it increases the degree of diversity of the toxodontids in the final stages of their evolutionary history: in the Upper Pleistocene only Toxodon, Trigodonops and Mixotoxodon were also known.

References 

Toxodonts
Pleistocene mammals of South America
Lujanian
Pleistocene Brazil
Fossils of Brazil
Fossil taxa described in 2013
Prehistoric placental genera